Gwynfi United F.C. is a Welsh football club from Blaengwynfi, a village in the Neath Port Talbot area of South Wales. They currently play in the Port Talbot Football League  Premier Division. The club played in the Welsh Football League for eleven seasons from 1996–97 until 2006–07 when they resigned from the league and their results from the season were expunged.

History

Welsh Football League history
Information in this section is sourced from the Football Club History Database.

Notes

Honours

Welsh Football League Division Three – Champions: 1996–97
Welsh Football League Division Two – Runners-up: 1997–98
South Wales Amateur League Division Two – Runners-up: 1994–95
Port Talbot Football League Premier Division – Champions: 2019–20

References

External links
Twitter

Football clubs in Wales
Welsh Football League clubs
Neath Port Talbot
Afan Valley
Port Talbot Football League clubs